The Hawk Industries Type 97 is the factory and official Chinese military and police designation of a shotgun design patterned after the Remington Model 870 manufactured by Hawk Industries, a division of the China North Industries Corporation (officially abbreviated as Norinco). The Type 97 is the base design of a variety of models with multiple configurations to suit different purposes and applications.

History 
Hawk Industries is based out of Qiqihar, Heilongjiang in northern China and was founded in 1954. The company designed the Type 97 in the late 90s as well a wide variety of shotguns for both export, and domestic use, and for civilian, hunting, police and military purposes.

Design

Type 97 
The Hawk Type 97 is patterned after the Remington 870. The base Type 97 configuration has a pistol grip and no stock, and often has a foregrip foreend.

Type 97-1 
The Type 97-1 looks almost identical to the Remington 870 (with which many parts are interchangeable), and is significantly cheaper. These shotguns are all chambered in 12-gauge, however, the internal barrel diameter is typically denoted metrically (18.4mm) in China. The civilian, and all other variants are capable of firing powerful 3 inch shotgun shells (76 mm), but can also fire shorter and weaker shells. Shells are loaded into a 5+1 internal under-barrel tube, and there is a heat shroud over the barrel. The civilian models are 35 inches (900 mm) long. 

The Type 97-1 has been adopted by the People's Armed Police (PAP) as the "18.4mm Type 97-1 Anti-riot gun", and the PF26W2 is the hunting variant. The export designation of the Type 97-1 is the Norinco HP9-1, or also the Hawk 982.

Type 97 Military/LE variants 
The Military/LE variants were designed and are exclusively produced and reserved for military and law enforcement applications. Shells are loaded into 5-shell proprietary detachable steel box magazines. Military/LE models can be factory-configured to mount tactical lights under the forend.

Hawk 97-2 
The Hawk Type 97-2, is patterned after the Remington Model 1100, and like the civilian model, is 35 inches (900 mm) long. They are configured with folding stocks, and are 26 inches (670mm) long with the stock folded. The semi-automatic version is the Hawk Semi-Auto.  

The Type 97-2 features rifle-type sights with a front blade and adjustable tangent rear sight designed for accuracy when loading slugs and non-lethal ammunition.

Hawk Bullpup
The Hawk Pump-Action and Semi-Auto bullpup shotguns are more compact, being only 25 inches (630 mm) long compared to the Hawk 97-1 and 97-2 variants that are 35 inches (900 mm) long. It resembles the QBZ-95 assault rifle, in large part due to the carrying handle and trigger guard with a notably large horizontal forward grip. In pump-action configurations, the shotgun slide forend is completely separated from the rifle contours.

The Hawk Bullpup also has an integrated carrying handle with fixed sights.

System of operation configurations 
In both civilian and Military/LE models, shells are fed into the chamber either semi-automatically (gas-operated) or by pump action depending on the system of operation configuration. Non-lethal ammunition, such as rubber bullets and pepper-spray projectiles, typically lack the power to fully send the bolt carrier to the rear resetting the firing pin in semi-automatic firearms, and thus can only be loaded into pump action guns which rely on the user rather than the energy of the ammunition to cycle the shells.

Users 

 :
People's Liberation Army
 People's Armed Police
 China Coast Guard

References 

Police weapons
Shotguns of the People's Republic of China